Strange Girl or variants may refer to:

 Strange Girl (film), 1962 Yugoslav drama film 
 Strange Girl (comics), comic series published by Image Comics
Strange Girls (album), album by Gore Gore Girls  (2000). The second album Up All Night, was released in 2002 and received
Strange Girls (band),  toured clubs in Great Britain in 1991